The Secure Electronic Network for Travelers Rapid Inspection (SENTRI) provides expedited U.S. Customs and Border Protection (CBP) processing, at the U.S.-Mexico border, of pre-approved travelers considered low-risk. Voluntarily applicants must undergo a thorough background check against criminal, customs, immigration, law enforcement, and terrorist databases; a 10-fingerprint law enforcement check; and a personal interview with a CBP Officer. The total enrollment fee is $122.50, and SENTRI status is valid for 5 years.

Once the applicant is approved, they are issued a Radio Frequency Identification (RFID) card identifying their status in the CBP database when arriving at U.S. land and sea ports of entry (POE). SENTRI users have access to dedicated lanes into the United States. Unlike NEXUS, which is a joint program between United States and Canadian immigration authorities, SENTRI is solely a CBP program and only applies to customs and immigrations inspections into the United States, not into Mexico. SENTRI members are permitted to utilize NEXUS lanes when entering the United States from Canada by land (but not vice versa).

Global Entry allows registered users to enter their own SENTRI applications and approved members to edit their information. A valid SENTRI card is a Western Hemisphere Travel Initiative (WHTI) compliant document.

History 

SENTRI was conceived in 1995.  A team of representatives from the Immigration and Naturalization Service (INS), U.S. Customs Service, and five other Federal stakeholder agencies was formed and established a technical concept, engineering design and relevant policies.  The first SENTRI lane was deployed at the Otay Mesa Port of Entry in San Diego, California, where the concept and design was refined.  Additional technology tests, including in-vehicle biometrics and laneside facial recognition, were conducted at this site.

In 1998, the decision was made to expand SENTRI to El Paso, Texas.  The aim was to relieve congestion at the busy Paso del Norte International Bridge.  However, this bridge was not wide enough to set aside one lane as a dedicated commuter lane.  Therefore, the nearby Stanton Street bridge, which had been a southbound-only bridge, was chosen as the best place to deploy SENTRI.  A new port of entry facility was built, and the SENTRI lane opened in September 1999.

Next, the SENTRI team elected to deploy a system at the busiest single border crossing in the world, San Ysidro, California.  The congested nature of Tijuana, near the border crossing, made it difficult to identify a place to put the dedicated lane, but with the cooperation of many organizations on both sides of the border, a lane was segregated, and SENTRI opened at San Ysidro in 2000, after which point the SENTRI team was disbanded, and SENTRI became a program office within INS.  After INS was sunsetted on March 1, 2003, the SENTRI program office was absorbed by DHS Customs and Border Protection.
Today, SENTRI Lanes can be found at the following ports of entry, from West to East: 
California
 San Ysidro Port of Entry, San Diego, California
 Otay Mesa Port of Entry, San Diego, California
 Calexico West Port of Entry, Calexico, California
 Calexico East Port of Entry, Calexico, California

Arizona
 San Luis Port of Entry, San Luis, Arizona
 Nogales-Grand Avenue Port of Entry, Nogales, Arizona
 Douglas Arizona Port of Entry, Douglas, Arizona

Texas
 El Paso Stanton Street Port of Entry, El Paso, Texas
 El Paso Ysleta Port of Entry, El Paso, Texas
 Del Rio Texas Port of Entry, Del Rio, Texas
 Eagle Pass Camino Real Port of Entry, Eagle Pass, Texas
 Laredo Colombia Solidarity Port of Entry, Laredo, Texas
 Laredo Juarez-Lincoln Port of Entry, Laredo, Texas
 Anzalduas Port of Entry, Mission, Texas
 Hidalgo Texas Port of Entry, Hidalgo, Texas
 Pharr Texas Port of Entry, Pharr, Texas
 Brownsville – Veterans Port of Entry, Brownsville, Texas

US Global Entry 
US citizens may use their SENTRI membership at US Customs and Border Protection Global Entry kiosks located in participating US airports. Mexican nationals who are SENTRI members may apply for Global Entry after passing a risk assessment conducted by the Mexican government.

TSA PreCheck 

US citizens who are SENTRI members may use TSA PreCheck on all participating airlines by entering their Customs and Border Protection ID number or PASS ID/KTN (Known Traveler Number) from their SENTRI card into their flight reservation information or into their frequent flyer account. The same privileges extend to NEXUS and Global Entry members. Note that such Trusted Travelers have a very high probability of receiving PreCheck, it is not guaranteed: TSA still uses random procedures for all passengers. This said, Global Entry participants have the absolute highest priority/likelihood for receiving PreCheck (per CBP documents, including a note that it’s included—not “may” receive—with GE).

Enrollment centers 
Enrollment centers are located in Douglas, Nogales, and San Luis, Arizona; Calexico, Otay Mesa, and San Ysidro, California; and Brownsville, El Paso, Hidalgo, and Laredo, Texas.

See also
Automatic vehicle identification
List of Mexico–United States border crossings
NEXUS
PORTPASS

References

External links
  Official website.
  Official website.

Expedited border crossing schemes
Radio-frequency identification
International travel documents
Mexico–United States border